Siderolamprus scansorius is a species of lizard of the Diploglossidae family. It is found in Honduras.

It was formerly classified in the genus Diploglossus, but was moved to Siderolamprus in 2021.

References

Siderolamprus
Reptiles described in 1996
Reptiles of Honduras
Endemic fauna of Honduras